Bishop Panteleimon (secular name Arkadiy Viktorovich Shatov, ; 18 September 1950, Moscow) is the Russian Orthodox Bishop of Orekhovo-Zuyevo and chairman of the Synodal Department for Church Charity and Social Ministry, Russian Orthodox Church.

From 21 August 2010 to 22 March 2011 he served as Bishop of Orekhovo-Zuyevo, vicar of the Moscow diocese.

References 

1950 births
Living people
Clergy from Moscow
Bishops of the Russian Orthodox Church